Zvuk slunečních hodin is a Czech novel, written by Hana Andronikova. It was first published in 2001.

2001 Czech novels